Prince of Hejian may refer to:

Princes (or kings) of Hejian Kingdom during the Han dynasty
Sima Yong (died 306), Jin dynasty prince
Murong Xi (385–407), Later Yan emperor, known as Prince of Hejian before he took the throne
Zhang Yu (general) (1343–1401), Ming dynasty general who died in the Jingnan campaign, posthumously honored as Prince of Hejian